George Knight (12 May 1921 – 24 August 2011) was an English professional footballer who played as an inside forward.

Despite being on the books at Burnley for nine years, he played just nine league games as his career was interrupted by the Second World War.

George played for Burnley's first team at the age of 17 but wartime and a knee injury cut his career short.

He died on 24 August 2011 at the age of 90, by which time he was Burnley's oldest surviving former player.

References

General

George Knight 1921–2011 Obituary at burnleyfootballclub.com

Specific

1921 births
2011 deaths
Footballers from Bolton
English footballers
Association football forwards
Burnley F.C. players
English Football League players